The 2005 season was the 100th season of competitive football in Norway.

Men's football

League season

Tippeligaen

Vålerenga won the 2005 Tippeligaen, while Aalesunds FK and FK Bodø/Glimt were relegated. Molde FK had to play two qualification matches against Moss from the 1. divisjon. Molde won the qualification matches and maintained their position in Tippeligaen.

The greatest surprises of the 2005 season were the great performance of IK Start, promoted to the Tippeligaen in the 2004 season and ended up winning silver, and the disappointing performance of Rosenborg BK which fought against relegation from the Tippeligaen after winning it for 13 straight seasons.

The season ended on a sad note as Fredrikstad's Dagfinn Enerly got a serious neck injury in the last round match against Start.

1. divisjon

2. divisjon

3. divisjon

Norwegian Cup

Bracket

Final

Molde beat Lillestrøm 4–2 (after extra time) in the final held November 6 at Ullevaal Stadion.

Women's football

League season

Toppserien

Kolbotn won the league in front of Team Strømmen and Fløya. Kattem were relegated together with
Asker who was forcibly relegated due to economic license issues.

1. divisjon

Arna-Bjørnar and Amazon Grimstad were promoted to Toppserien.

Norwegian Women's Cup

Final
Asker 4–0 (a.e.t.) Team Strømmen

Men's UEFA competitions

Norwegian representatives
Rosenborg (UEFA Champions League) 
Vålerenga (UEFA Champions League) 
Brann (UEFA Cup) 
Tromsø (UEFA Cup) 
Viking (UEFA Cup)

Champions League

Qualifying rounds

Second qualifying round

|}

Third qualifying round

|}

Group stage

Group F

UEFA Cup

Qualifying rounds

First qualifying round

|}

Second qualifying round

|}

First round

|}

Group stage

Group A

Group E

Knockout stage

Round of 32

|}

Intertoto Cup
No Norwegian representative this season.

UEFA Women's Cup

First qualifying round

Group 4

Matches

 Røa – Valur 1–4
 Røa – Pärnu JK 9–1
 United Jakobstad – Røa 2–3

National teams

Norway men's national football team

* Norway's goals first

Explanation:
 og = own goal
 F= Friendly
 WCQ5 = World Cup 2006 qualifier, European zone, group 5
 WCQP = World Cup 2006 qualifier, European zone, playoff

Norway women's national football team

References

 
Seasons in Norwegian football